Global Underground 009: Sasha, San Francisco is a DJ mix album in the Global Underground series, compiled and mixed by Sasha. It was released on 9 November 1998 through the label Boxed in the UK, and Thrive in the US, where the release was numbered 003. "Hale Bopp" (Disc 2, Track 3 in UK release) is omitted, reducing the number of tracks on the US version to 26.

In a 2019 poll conducted on Global Underground's website, the album was voted the second-best in the series, behind Sasha's own Global Underground 013: Ibiza.

Track listing

Disc one
 "Intro" – 3:07
 Freaky Chakra - "Platform" – 7:23
 Attaboy - "Solid Space Business" – 2:12
 DJ Sakin - "Protect Your Mind (Van Bellen Mix)" – 6:46
 Classified Project - "Resurrection" – 5:54
 Medway - "The Resurrection E.P." – 6:09
 Slickmick - "Lecture" – 2:42
 Sneaky Alien - "Blue Stream" – 4:48
 Funk Function - "Empress II" – 3:56
 Travel - "Bulgarian (Incisions Remix)" – 6:24
 Joi Cardwell - "Soul to Bare (C. Hornbostel Remix)" – 3:42
 Stoneproof - "Everything's Not You (Quivver's Space Mix)" – 6:23
 Morgan King - "I'm Free (William Orbit Mix)" – 8:44
 Libra present Taylor - "Anomaly - Calling Your Name (Albion Mix)" – 5:29

Disc two
 "Intro" – 3:40
 Narcotik - "Blue" – 5:39
 Der Dritte Raum - "Hale Bopp" – 4:34
 Illuminatus - "Hope" – 4:48
 Dave Kane - "Clarkness" – 4:48
 Eclipse Eight - "Acoustic Principles" – 5:17
 Mana - "Psionic" – 4:48
 Breeder - "The Chain" – 9:38
 Paragliders - "Change Me" – 5:46
 Breeder - "Twilo Thunder" – 9:08
 Jark Prongo - "Movin' Thru Your System" – 5:02
 DJ Tomcraft - "The Mission" – 5:46
 Tilt - "I Dream (Tilt's Resurrection Mix)" – 4:45

Charts

References

External links 

Global Underground
Sasha (DJ) albums
1999 compilation albums
DJ mix albums